Burton Leland (November 24, 1948 – February 25, 2018) was a Democratic politician from Michigan who served on the Wayne County Commission. He also served 24 years in both houses of the Michigan Legislature.

While in the Michigan House of Representatives in 1986, Leland sponsored the state's Lemon Law. Leland died from cancer on February 25, 2018.

References

1948 births
2018 deaths
Politicians from Detroit
University of Michigan School of Social Work alumni
Wayne State University alumni
American social workers
County commissioners in Michigan
Democratic Party members of the Michigan House of Representatives
Democratic Party Michigan state senators
Deaths from cancer in Michigan